A self-clasping handshake is a gesture in which one hand is grasped by the other and held together in front of the body or over the head.  In the United States, this gesture is a sign of victory, being made by the winning boxer at the end of a fight. Leaders of the Soviet Union, such as Nikita Khrushchev, used the gesture to symbolise friendship when visiting the United States, and so risked misunderstanding.

References

American cultural conventions
Hand gestures
Victory